Brian Kenneth 'Boom Boom' McCutcheon (born August 3, 1949) is a Canadian former professional ice hockey player who played 37 games in the National Hockey League with the Detroit Red Wings between 1974 and 1976. Since 1981 he has served in a variety of coaching positions spread across many leagues, most recently as head coach for Füchse Duisburg in 2015–16.

Playing career
McCutcheon played minor ice hockey in Toronto, and went to the 1962 Quebec International Pee-Wee Hockey Tournament with the Toronto Shopsy's youth team. He was recruited to play at Cornell under Ned Harkness. In his junior season McCutcheon led his team in goals while the Big Red compiled the first (and thus far only) undefeated national championship in NCAA history. After graduating in 1971 McCutcheon embarked on a professional career. Despite going undrafted, McCutcheon was signed by the Detroit Red Wings. After scoring only 7 points in 45 games across three leagues in 1971-72 McCutcheon settled down with the Virginia Wings in the mid-1970s, eventually receiving a call-up to the parent club. While McCutcheon was a capable minor league player he couldn't adjust to the NHL level, recording only 4 points in 37 games over three seasons with the Wings. He spent the entire 1977-78 season in the CHL before heading overseas to finish his playing career with EC Graz.

Coaching career

College
A year after hanging up his skates McCutcheon reappeared behind the bench at Elmira, a Division III program. Over six seasons with the Soaring Eagles McCutcheon saw a good amount of success, posting 5 winning records, and an appearance in the 1986 tournament. In 1987 he returned to his alma mater taking over as head coach from Lou Reycroft, becoming the second player from the 1970 team to coach the Big Red (Dick Bertrand being the first).

McCutcheon was tasked with rebuilding Cornell to its former glory after having declined over the previous ten years. The initial years were good, seeing the big Red post five consecutive winning seasons and making the tournament in 1991 but from 1992–93 on the team struggled and finished with three straight losing campaigns. Compounding matters, McCutcheon had become infamous for his antics and he was fired in 1995.

Professional
Despite the ending in Ithaca McCutcheon didn't stay idle for long, accepting a position as an assistant with the Los Angeles Ice Dogs for the 1995–96 season. The following year he became the head coach for the Columbus Chill of the ECHL, leading the team to its first division title and receiving the John Brophy Award for his efforts. As further recognition he was promoted to the AHL and coached the Rochester Americans to consecutive Calder Cup finals. McCutcheon eventually made his way back to the NHL, becoming an assistant with the Buffalo Sabres under Lindy Ruff. McCutcheon was named as an associate in 2006 but left the team five years later when his contract was not renewed. Since leaving the NHL McCutcheon has coached several teams in Europe in varying capacities.

Career statistics

Regular season and playoffs

Head coaching record

Awards and honors

References

External links
 

1949 births
Living people
ATSE Graz players
Buffalo Sabres coaches
Canadian expatriate ice hockey players in England
Canadian ice hockey coaches
Cornell Big Red men's ice hockey coaches
Cornell Big Red men's ice hockey players
Canadian ice hockey centres
Detroit Red Wings players
Fort Worth Wings players
Kansas City Blues players
Kansas City Red Wings players
London Lions (ice hockey) players
NCAA men's ice hockey national champions
New Haven Nighthawks players
Port Huron Wings players
Ice hockey people from Toronto
Tidewater Wings players
Undrafted National Hockey League players
Virginia Wings players
Canadian expatriate sportspeople in Italy
Canadian expatriate ice hockey players in the United States
Canadian expatriate sportspeople in Germany
Canadian expatriate ice hockey players in Austria